Neolepolepis occidentalis is a species of scaly-winged barklouse in the family Lepidopsocidae. It is found in North America.

References

Trogiomorpha
Articles created by Qbugbot
Insects described in 1955